Warea cuneifolia is a species of annual flowering plant native to North America. It grows in the Florida Panhandle, sections of Alabama, and South Carolina. It goes by the common name Carolina pinelandcress. It has pom pom like purple or pinkish flowers.

References

Brassicaceae